Torretassoa alfierii is a species of beetle in the family Carabidae, the only species in the genus Torretassoa.

References

Scaritinae